Ptilothyris crossoceros is a moth in the family Lecithoceridae. It was described by Edward Meyrick in 1934. It is found in the Democratic Republic of the Congo (North Kivu) and Tanzania.

References

Moths described in 1934
Ptilothyris
Taxa named by Edward Meyrick